Lake O'Woods, also known as the Edward and Rebecca Pitchford Davis House, is a historic plantation house located near Inez, Warren County, North Carolina.  The main house was built by Albert Gamaliel Jones in 1852.  It is a two-story, three bay by two bay, Greek Revival style frame dwelling.  It has a shallow, overhanging hipped roof and entrance porch with fluted columns. Also on the property are the contributing earlier house or kitchen (c. 1790); four hole outhouse; a log chicken house; an early smokehouse and a later one of logs; a mounted farm bell; a well; and a collection of barns and stable.

It was listed on the National Register of Historic Places in 1979.

References 

Plantation houses in North Carolina
Houses on the National Register of Historic Places in North Carolina
Greek Revival houses in North Carolina
Houses completed in 1852
Houses in Warren County, North Carolina
National Register of Historic Places in Warren County, North Carolina
1852 establishments in North Carolina